Mepyramine, also known as pyrilamine, is a first generation antihistamine, targeting the H1 receptor as an inverse agonist. Mepyramine rapidly permeates the brain, often causing drowsiness. It is often sold as a maleate salt, pyrilamine maleate. 

The medication has negligible anticholinergic activity, with 130,000-fold selectivity for the histamine H1 receptor over the muscarinic acetylcholine receptors (for comparison, diphenhydramine had 20-fold selectivity for the H1 receptor). 

It was patented in 1943 and came into medical use in 1949.
It was marketed under the names Histadyl, Histalon, Neo-Antergan, Neo-Pyramine, and Nisaval.  In the 1960s and 70s it was a very common component in over-the-counter sleep aids such as "Alva-Tranquil", "Dormin", "Sedacaps", "Sominex", "Nytol", and many others.

It is used in over-the-counter combination products to treat the common cold and menstrual symptoms such as Midol Complete. It is also the active ingredient of the topical antihistamine creams Anthisan and Neoantergan sold for the treatment of insect bites, stings, and nettle rash.

See also
 Chloropyramine (chloro instead of methoxy)

References 

Aminopyridines
H1 receptor antagonists
Muscarinic antagonists
Phenol ethers
Sigma receptor ligands